Blue Lights is an album by American jazz guitarist Kenny Burrell recorded in 1958 and released on the Blue Note label as two 12 inch LPs entitled Volume 1 and Volume 2. The cover features artwork by Andy Warhol. The album was subsequently reissued (with a re-ordered track sequence) as separate CDs and a two disc set combining Volume 1 and Volume 2.

Reception
The AllMusic review by Scott Yanow awarded the album 4½ stars stating "Guitarist Kenny Burrell leads a very coherent jam session in the studio with a particularly strong cast".

Track listing
All compositions by Kenny Burrell except as indicated
Volume 1
 "Yes Baby" - 11:15
 "Scotch Blues" (Duke Jordan) - 8:00
 "Autumn in New York" (Vernon Duke) - 5:44
 "Caravan" (Duke Ellington, Irving Mills, Juan Tizol) - 9:55

Volume 2
 "Rock Salt" - 11:19
 "The Man I Love" (George Gershwin, Ira Gershwin) - 6:47
 "Chuckin'" (Sam Jones) - 12:10
 "Phinupi" - 9:47

Bonus track on CD reissue
 "I Never Knew" (Ted Fio Rito, Gus Kahn) - 12:37  (Disc 1, Track #5)

Recorded at Manhattan Towers in New York City on May 14, 1958.

Personnel
Kenny Burrell - guitar
Louis Smith - trumpet
Tina Brooks (Volume 1: tracks 2, 3 & 5; Volume 2: tracks 1-3), Junior Cook (Volume 1: tracks 1-3 & 5; Volume 2: tracks 1-3) - tenor saxophone
Duke Jordan (Volume 1), Bobby Timmons (Volume 2) - piano
Sam Jones - bass
Art Blakey - drums

References

Blue Note Records albums
Kenny Burrell albums
1958 albums
Albums produced by Alfred Lion
Albums with cover art by Andy Warhol